Seal meat is the flesh, including the blubber and organs, of seals used as food for humans or other animals. It is prepared in numerous ways, often being hung and dried before consumption. Historically, it has been eaten in many parts of the world, both as a part of a normal diet, and as sustenance.

Practice of human consumption continues today in Japan, Sweden, Norway, Iceland, the Faroe Islands, the Inuit and other indigenous peoples of the United States (including the Makah people of the Pacific Northwest), Canada, Greenland; the Chukchi people of Siberia,Bequia Island in the Caribbean Sea.

Cultural issues
The Inuk/Jewish activist Killaq Enuaraq-Strauss has argued that seal meat can be considered kosher. Citing the principle of "pikuach nefesh", she claims that it is acceptable for Inuit Jews to consume seal meat given that it is necessary for the survival of Inuit living in the Arctic. An advocate for environmental sustainability, she has emphasized the shared value within both Inuit and Jewish culture to treat animals humanely. Seals are traditionally considered non-kosher animals because water animals have to have scales to be considered kosher and land animals must have split hooves and must chew their cud.

Nutritional value

Seal blubber and meat was studied to help understand the nutritional composition. Two species were evaluated by the Department of Biology of the University of Bergen and the National Institute of Nutrition and Seafood Research. The species were the hooded seal (Cystophora cristata) and harp seal (Phagophilus groenlandicus). The specimens used in the study were taken from Greenland's West Ice.

Seal meat in general is lean, containing less than 2% fat. This fat is mostly MUFAs, long- and very long chain omega-3 PUFAs. Also, the meat is high in protein and has an amino acid composition that is well balanced.

The study showed significant differences in nutritional composition from one seal to another. This may have been due to the highly varied age and size of the seals tested. In general, both the meat and blubber can be considered to be high quality food in terms of bioactive components and nutrients. On average, a woman's recommended daily intake of vitamin B12 and iron can be met with only 40 grams of seal meat. 

A significant difference between species was found in the eicosapentaenoic acid (EPA) content of both the meat and blubber. Harp seal blubber contained 9.2% while the muscle tissue contained only 3%. 

High levels of trace elements were found. In particular, hooded seal muscle meat contained 379 μg/g of iron and harp seal muscle meat contained 30 μg/g of zinc.

See also

Country food
Inuit cuisine
Chukchi cuisine
Flipper pie
Marine mammals as food
Wildlife trade

References

Faroese cuisine
Greenlandic cuisine
Icelandic cuisine
Japanese cuisine
Norwegian cuisine
Inuit cuisine
Russian cuisine
Saint Vincent and the Grenadines cuisine
Environmental controversies

Meat by animal